Minuscule 282 (in the Gregory-Aland numbering), ε 280 (Soden), is a Greek minuscule manuscript of the New Testament, on parchment. It is dated by a colophon to the year 1176.
It has full marginalia.

Description 

The codex contains the text of the four Gospels on 150 parchment leaves. The text is written in two columns per page, in 33-34 lines per page.

There is also another division according to the smaller Ammonian Sections (in Mark 235 Sections, the last in 16:12) was added by a later hand, but without references to the Eusebian Canons (written below Ammonian Section numbers).

It contains the Eusebian Canon tables, lectionary markings at the margin for liturgical use, and subscriptions at the end of each Gospel.

Text 

The Greek text of the codex is a representative of the Byzantine text-type. Hermann von Soden classified it to the textual family Kx. Aland placed it in Category V.

According to the Claremont Profile Method it represents textual family Kx in Luke 10 and Luke 20. In Luke 1 it has a mixture of the Byzantine text-families and creates pair with 1714.

History 

The manuscript was added to the list of New Testament manuscripts by Scholz (1794-1852).
It was examined and described by Paulin Martin and Henri Omont. C. R. Gregory saw it in 1885.

The manuscript is currently housed at the Bibliothèque nationale de France (Gr. 90) at Paris.

See also 

 List of New Testament minuscules
 Biblical manuscript
 Textual criticism

References

Further reading 

 Jean-Pierre-Paul Martin, Description technique des manuscrits grecs, relatif au Nouveau Testament, conservé dans les bibliothèques des Paris (Paris 1883), p. 68.
 Henri Omont, Fac-similés des manuscrits grecs datés de la Bibliothèque Nationale du IXe et XIVe siècle (Paris, 1891), 49.

Greek New Testament minuscules
12th-century biblical manuscripts
Bibliothèque nationale de France collections